Energi 1 is a power company that serves Røyken, Ski, Enebakk and Nesodden in Norway. It provides the power grid in the municipality, with a total of 34,000 customers, as well as selling electricity through the subsidiary Energi 1 Kraftsalg Follo AS. Formerly the company was owned by the municipalities it serves.

Electric power companies of Norway
Companies based in Akershus
Companies formerly owned by municipalities of Norway
Year of establishment missing